Iestyn Harris (born 24 November 1998) is a Welsh rugby union player, currently playing for Premiership Rugby side Exeter Chiefs. His preferred position is hooker.

On the 6th April 2022, Harris was released by Cardiff Rugby, he proceeded to sign for the Exeter Chiefs following his release, he will begin service in the 2022-23 season.

Cardiff Blues
Harris signed his first professional contract for Cardiff Blues in September 2020. He made his Cardiff Blues debut in Round 7 of the 2020–21 Pro14 against Leinster.

References

External links
itsrugby.co.uk Profile

1998 births
Living people
Welsh rugby union players
Cardiff Rugby players
Rugby union hookers